Mad Shadows may refer to:

Mad Shadows (album), an album by English rock band Mott the Hoople
Mad Shadows (novel), the English title of a novel by Canadian author Marie-Claire Blais